1983–84 was the 37th season of the Western International Hockey League.

Standings

Playoffs

Semi final
Best of 7
 Nelson Maple Leafs defeated Trail Smoke Eaters 4 games to 1 (4-3 OT, 3-4, 4-2, 6-4, 3-2)

Final
Best of 7
 Spokane Chiefs defeated Nelson Maple Leafs 4 games to 2
Spokane Chiefs advanced to the 1983-84 Western Canada Allan Cup Playoffs.

References 

Western International Hockey League seasons
WIHL
WIHL